The Musa Khel, or Moosa Khel, is a Pashtun tribe of Ghilji origin. They are part of the Ghilji. The tribe resides in the tribal range of Musakhel Shangla and Batagram Districts in the Khyber-Pakhtunkhwa province of Pakistan. They also reside in the Khost and Ghazni provinces of Afghanistan. The Musakhel tribe enjoy unique history due to its location. Musakhel borders the district of the southern Pashtun belt. It separates the Pashtun belt from the Baloch belt and Punjab (Tunsa).

References

External links
Balochistan.gov.pk
Khel Bāzār|PK|Pakistan|Asia/Karachi|PK.02|PPL|30.8666667|69.8166667|Balochistān
BBC article (in Urdu)
PASHTUN TRIBAL DYNAMICS

Gharghashti Pashtun tribes
Social groups of Pakistan
Pashto-language surnames
Pakistani names